Irina Sergeyevna Khabarova (born March 18, 1966) is a Russian sprinter.

She won the silver medal in 4 x 100 metres relay at the 2004 Olympics and a bronze medal in the same event at both the 2002 and 2006 European Championships.

Personal bests
100 metres – 11.18 (2006)	 
200 metres – 22.34 (2004)

References

1966 births
Living people
Sportspeople from Yekaterinburg
Russian female sprinters
Olympic female sprinters
Olympic athletes of Russia
Olympic silver medalists for Russia
Olympic silver medalists in athletics (track and field)
Athletes (track and field) at the 2000 Summer Olympics
Athletes (track and field) at the 2004 Summer Olympics
Medalists at the 2004 Summer Olympics
World Athletics Championships athletes for Russia
European Athletics Championships winners
European Athletics Championships medalists
Russian Athletics Championships winners
World Athletics indoor record holders (relay)